TCPA may refer to:

 Telephone Consumer Protection Act of 1991, United States law
 Town and Country Planning Act 1990, act of the United Kingdom Parliament
 Town and Country Planning Association, United Kingdom independent charity
 Trusted Computing Platform Alliance, former computer industry group succeeded by the Trusted Computing Group